Dr. Cándido Pérez is a Mexican television sitcom that aired on Televisa's Canal de las Estrellas from 1987 to 1993, starring Jorge Ortiz de Pinedo as the title character. The show is based on the 1962 film Dr. Cándido Pérez, señoras. It was recorded at Televisa San Ángel with a live studio audience.

Cast

Main characters
 Cándido Pérez (Jorge Ortiz de Pinedo): The main character and protagonist in the series who is a gynecologist always getting nervous and hyper in any situation that goes wrong.
 Silvina Pérez (Nuria Bages): The wife of Cándido Pérez, often very suspicious of her husband.
 Catalina (Alejandra Meyer): The mother of Silvina Pérez and mother-in-law of Cándido Pérez, whom she never gets along with.
 Paula (Lupe Vázquez): Cándido Pérez's assistant nurse in his office.
 Claudia (María Luisa Alcalá): The Pérez family's housekeeper.

Recurring characters
 Father Camilo (Juan Verduzco): A preacher.
 Inocencio Pérez (David Ramos): Son of Cándido Pérez.
 Perlita Pérez (Georgina Mariana): Daughter of Cándido Pérez.

Remake

On October 22, 2020, Televisa announced that a new version of the series will premiere in 2021. The series will be produced by Pedro Ortiz de Pinedo. Arath de la Torre is set to star as Dr. Cándido Pérez.

References

External links
 

Mexican television sitcoms
1987 Mexican television series debuts
1993 Mexican television series endings
1980s Mexican television series
1990s Mexican television series
Las Estrellas original programming
Television series by Televisa
Spanish-language television shows